Varatharajah Thurairajah (born March 3, 1975) is an Eelam Tamil physician and human rights activist. He is one of the official witnesses for the United Nations investigations on war crimes and human rights violations in Sri Lanka. He is a first-hand witness of the events in the "No Fire Zone" in Mullivaikkal, Mullaitivu; and has revealed information to the world about the planned genocide of Tamils in 2009. He is currently engaged in activities related to creating awareness about the issue.

Career

Eechilampatru and Vakarai: June 2006 to February 2007 
As of 2006, Varatharajah was said to be the only doctor in the town of Vakarai, Sri Lanka. He went to Varakai as a refugee and decided to stay there with other refugees. When Varakai was captured by Sri Lankan government forces in January 2007, Varatharajah was allegedly the last person to leave the town.

Mullivaikkal, Mullaitivu: February 2007 to May 2009 
In January 2009, the Sri Lankan government announced that there were only 80,000 people in the LTTE controlled areas of Northern Province, but in reality, there were around 340,000 people. Since there was no presence of foreign media in the war zone, Dr. Varatharajah was the only credible source for reporting humanitarian and human rights crisis to outside world. During that time, Sri Lankan government independently declared a ‘No Fire Zone’ in Suthanthirapuram without consulting any medical staff. Puthukkudiyiruppu hospital was not included in the "No Fire Zone". After the announcement of a "No Fire Zone<", people were forced to move to Suthanthirapuram where all civilians were crowded into a small area. Later in the record, it was mentioned that more people were killed in the ‘No Fire Zone’ area than other areas. While Dr. Varatharajah stayed at Puthukkudiyiruppu hospital treating casualties from Suthanthirapuram, he was informing the situation to ICRC, INGOs and the government. Dr. Sathiyamoorthy, the regional director of health services from Kilinochchi, and fellow staff moved to Mullaitivu and worked with Dr. Varatharajah. Around 7 government doctors, including Dr. Varatharajah, with other medical staff and volunteers served nearly 340,000 people in the war zone. After several weeks, Puthukkudiyiruppu hospital was also destroyed by government shelling and bombing. Therefore, Dr. Varatharajah and other staff moved to Puthumaththalam and Mullivaikkal area and set-up a makeshift hospital at a school to treat the casualties. He reported about the dead and injured in that area as well as on the shortage of medical and food supplies. He contacted the ICRC to transfer critically injured and ill people out from the war zone via boats. This way, around 10,000 injured people were saved while raising the awareness of the humanitarian and human right crisis to the world.

Detention and media appearances 
During the last days of the war, he was in the “No-Fire Zone” attending patients at the Mullivaikkal hospital. Following a severe injury in his shoulder and abdomen due to non-stop shelling, he was arrested by the army on 15 May 2009 and detained for about 100 days after the end of the war. He was kept at an unknown location and denied medical treatment for his paralyzed arm and lung filled with blood which led to septic fever due to war injuries.

On 23 May 2009, he was taken to the fourth floor of the Criminal Investigation Department (CID). On 8 July 2009, doctors, who had stayed in the war zone including Dr. Varatharajah was paraded in front of media and forced to deny their reporting from the war zone. Suresh Sallay has been identified as the military intelligence officer responsible for coercing Dr. Varatharajah to give false testimony. After being released from prison, Dr. Varatharajah contacted UN and other human right groups explaining what happened to them and the situation forcing them to lie in front of government paraded media conference in Colombo. He also requested the UN and other human rights groups to record the truth.

Human right activism 
In December 2011, award winning and a well-known journalist, Callum Macrae from Channel 4 media interviewed Dr. Varatharajah in New York about Sri Lanka’s human rights violations and war crimes.

In 2013, he participated and provided his testimony as a witness to the Permanent People’s Tribunal in Bremen, Germany in front of a list of panelists from former UN representatives.

In 2014, he went to UN at Geneva and provided a speech at a human rights session and participated at a side event as well. As a Human Rights Watch sponsored member, he spoke at the UN General Assembly too. Channel 4 UK interviewed him and broadcast it to raise awareness for justice for the war crimes and crimes against humanity committed during 2009.

In May 2015, Dr. Varatharajah participated in the 6th anniversary of the Tamil genocide in 2009 and provided a public speech in London, UK. Following that he met several parliamentarians in London and discussed about human rights violation and crimes against humanity and advocated for justice for the victims in 2009.

In April 2016, he delivered a speech about human right violation by Sri Lankan government and the final days of the war in a symposium organized by the Boston Amnesty International in New York.

In May 2019, he was invited to the Canadian parliament as a guest speaker at the screening of Callum Macrae’s documentary "No Fire Zone" on the tenth year of Mullivaikal and Tamil genocide Remembrance Day and shared his war zone experiences.

Awards and recognition 
Finalist for Robert Burns Humanitarian Awards 2021, https://www.scottishlegal.com/article/robert-burns-humanitarian-award-2021-finalists-revealed .
Ilankai Tamil Sangam USA on behalf of the Tamil American Community awarded their highest recognition award of “Lifetime Service Award” in 2017 for his courageous service to humanity and for his acts of valor in the face of oppression, intimidation, and violence.

His memoirs, titled “A Note from The No Fire Zone” and written Kass Ghayouri was published in May 2019.
His biography written as a book, title "Untold Truth of Tamil Genocide (Biography of Dr.T.Varatharajah) and written Raji Patterson was published in 2021
The movie “ The Lamp of Truth” (www.thelampoftruth.com) was produced based on Dr Varatharajah’s war zone experiences and he played his own role in the movie. White Conch Studios, Ambuli Media, and TransImage jointly worked together to deliver this movie which was released in 2020.

He gave several media interviews, most notably for Channel 4, BBC, IBC London, Aljazeera, Lankasri, Canadian media such as CTR, EyeTamil Montreal, Parai, India’s Ananda Vikatan, Tamilguardian, Samakalam, Tamilnet, Tamilwin, TamilCNN, Ilakku, Urimai, SKY news and Sri Lankan local news media on the plight of the refugees and war-affected people of Sri Lanka.

He was nominated for the Nobel Peace Prize by Tamils for Obama, for having worked in tough war-torn conditions in Sri Lanka during the final and bloodiest phase of the Sri Lankan Civil War 2009. Currently he has been nominated for 2020 Sydney Peace Prize for the same reason.

References 

Sri Lankan activists
Sri Lankan medical doctors
1975 births
Living people